The Gordon Bowker Volcano Prize is a British and Irish literary award for a novel focusing on travel, awarded annually by the Society of Authors. It was inaugurated in 2022, and is named for Malcolm Lowry's book Under the Volcano and endowed in memory of Gordon Bowker (1934-2019), Lowry's biographer, by Ramdei Bowker.  

The three judges in the inaugural year of the prize were Caroline Brothers, Philip Hensher and Aamer Hussein. Brothers said of the shortlist:

The prize is awarded for "a novel focusing on the experience of travel away from home" written in English, published in Britain or Ireland, by a British or Irish author or resident. The winner receives £2,000, and a runner-up receives £750.

Winners and shortlists

2022
 Winner: 
Runner-up 
Shortlist:  
Shortlist: 
Shortlist:

References

External links

British fiction awards
Irish literary awards
Awards established in 2022